Thomas Buchanan Read School is a historic school building located in the Elmwood Park neighborhood of Philadelphia, Pennsylvania. It was designed by Henry deCoursey Richards and built in 1906–1908. It is a two-story, 20 bay, red brick building with limestone trim in the Georgian Revival-style. It features a large projecting section, recessed entrance bays, brick piers with stone capitals, and a hipped roof with copper cupola.

It was added to the National Register of Historic Places in 1986. It was home to the Motivation High School before the latter moved to its current location on Baltimore Avenue in 2013.

References

School buildings on the National Register of Historic Places in Philadelphia
Georgian Revival architecture in Pennsylvania
School buildings completed in 1908
School District of Philadelphia
Southwest Philadelphia
1908 establishments in Pennsylvania